Big Bald Mountain, also known as Bald Mountain, is a prominent peak in the Canadian province of New Brunswick.  It lies adjacent to Colonels Mountain, east of the Christmas Mountains, and near the headwaters of the Northwest Miramichi River, the Sevogle River, and the South Branch Nepisiguit River.  It is a well-known feature, in part because of its height, but especially because of its bald summit (hence the name).

Before aerial surveillance was extensively used, a hut was maintained on the summit for fire-spotting in the remote north-central part of the province.  A very similar hut was maintained on Mount Carleton, the province's highest peak.  Triangulation among these huts and other fire towers allowed the locations of wildfires to be determined quickly and easily.

References

Big Bald
Landforms of Northumberland County, New Brunswick
Mountains of Canada under 1000 metres